The Greek Amputee Football Association is the Greek governing body of amputee football and represents Greece at international events and competitions. In February 2016, Amputee Football Greece became the 14th European national team with the support of EAFF.

History
In June 2016, the Greeks participated in the EAFF Amputee Football Weeks project for the first time. The project took place in Corinth city with the participation of the following players: Alexandros Theodoridis, Dimitris Vouvopoulos, Tasos Tsigas, Georgios Lazaridis, Vasilis Mpakogiannis, Nikolaos Papakyrgiakis, Ioannis Vasiadis, Dimitris Agrianitis, and Nikolaos Papaggelis. The unofficial adapted training games, held in Pallini city, against AEK Futsal were the first-ever friendly encounters for the newly formed team. On 8 January 2017, the national side participated in a charity tournament against Olympiacos academy staff and Greece homeless team to raise poverty awareness and offer as many food supplies as possible to homeless people. On 9 June 2017, Greece lost, 0-5, to England in its first official friendly game. On 24 June 2017, Greece participated in the Amputee Football Cup for the first time in its short history. The team competed against Japan and Poland on the opening day of the international friendly cup and faced France on the following day, losing on all three occasions. On 3 October 2017, Greece participated in the European Championship for the first time. On 21 October 2018, the Greeks won their first-ever trophy in a friendly tournament held in Bruge, Belgium. Greece 2004 Legends played an exhibition game against Greece Amp in July 2021. Greece participated in the 2021 edition of the European Amputee Football Championship and finished tenth. In January 2022, the team obtained the Gazzetta Fair Play award after receiving 55,273 online votes by the fans.

Kit providers
Updated 7 December 2021

Results and fixtures

Friendlies

Euro 2017

Friendlies

Euro 2021

Competitions

Amp Futbol Cups

European Championship

Head-to-head record
, after the match against Germany.

Honours and achievements

European cups
EAFF European Championship
 Last 14 (1): 2021
 Group Stage (1): 2017

Friendly cups
Tournoi des amputés à Bruges
 Winners (1): 2018

Fair play awards
EAFF European Championship
 Winners (1): 2021
Tournoi des amputés à Bruges
 Winners (1): 2018
NIVEA MEN Gazzetta Awards
 Winners (1): 2022

Players

Current squad

The following players comprise the Greek national amputee football squad.
Official and unofficial games count as caps. Caps and goals accurate as of 28 September 2021.

Recent call-ups
The following footballers were part of a national selection in the last year, but are not part of the current squad.

Notes
INJ = Not part of the current squad due to injury
WD = Withdrew from this squad due to injury
PRE = Preliminary squad / standby

Coaching and technical staff

Coaching history
Updated 26 February 2023

References

Extra links
 Greek Amputee Football Association - Official Facebook Site 
 EAFF Members - Official EAFF Site 
 EAFF Amputee Football Weeks - Greece 2016

National amputee team
Association football governing bodies in Greece
Association football clubs established in 2016
Amputee football governing bodies in Europe
2016 establishments in Greece